Bad Behaviour is a 2023 dark comedy film directed, starred and co-written by Alice Englert in her feature directorial debut.

It premiered at the 2023 Sundance Film Festival on January 21, 2023.

Cast
Jennifer Connelly as Lucy, a former child actress
Ben Whishaw as Elon Bello, a spiritual leader
Alice Englert as Dylan, Lucy's daughter and stunt-performer
Ana Scotney
Dasha Nekrasova
Marlon Williams

Production
In June 2022, it was announced that Jennifer Connelly and Ben Whishaw joined the cast of the film, with Alice Englert directing from a screenplay she wrote. During an interview with W in November 2022, Englert revealed that the production took place in New Zealand and had then-recently wrapped.

Release
Bad Behaviour had its world premiere at 2023 Sundance Film Festival, on January 21, 2023.

Reception
On the review aggregator website Rotten Tomatoes, 47% of 34 critics' reviews are positive, with an average rating of 5.1/10. Metacritic, which uses a weighted average, assigned the film a score of 57 out of 100, based on 12 critics, indicating "mixed or average reviews".

References

External links

2023 directorial debut films
2023 independent films
2023 comedy-drama films
2020s black comedy films
2020s New Zealand films